The 2018 Internazionali di Tennis del Friuli Venezia Giulia was a professional tennis tournament played on clay courts. It was the fifteenth edition of the tournament which was part of the 2018 ATP Challenger Tour. It took place in Cordenons, Italy between 13 and 19 August 2018.

Singles main-draw entrants

Seeds

 1 Rankings are as of 6 August 2018.

Other entrants
The following players received wildcards into the singles main draw:
  Riccardo Balzerani
  Jacopo Berrettini
  Enrico Dalla Valle
  Francesco Forti

The following player received entry into the singles main draw as an alternate:
  Daniel Muñoz de la Nava

The following players received entry from the qualifying draw:
  Riccardo Bonadio
  Enzo Couacaud
  Daniel Dutra da Silva
  Máté Valkusz

The following player received entry as a lucky loser:
  Markus Eriksson

Champions

Singles

  Paolo Lorenzi def.  Máté Valkusz 6–3, 3–6, 6–4.

Doubles

  Denys Molchanov /  Igor Zelenay def.  Andrej Martin /  Daniel Muñoz de la Nava 3–6, 6–3, [11–9].

References

2018 ATP Challenger Tour
2018
2018 in Italian tennis